Jean-Christophe "Jules" Boullion (born 27 December 1969) is a French professional racing driver who raced in Formula One for the Sauber team.

Career
Born in Saint-Brieuc, near Côtes d'Armor, Boullion started karting in 1982 and moved to cars in 1988 after attending a racing school outside Paris. He started racing in Formula Ford 1600 in 1989. The following year he won the French title and moved to Formula 3. In 1993 he entered Formula 3000 and won the FIA International Championship in 1994. Although he was signed to test for Williams, he was loaned to Sauber to replace Karl Wendlinger for much of the 1995 season, scoring points twice but rarely matching his team-mate Heinz-Harald Frentzen. The following year he returned to his testing role at Williams, and he later tested for Jordan and Tyrrell.

In 1997 he raced briefly in the Renault Spider Eurocup, and he campaigned a Renault Laguna touring car for the Williams team in the British Touring Car Championship (BTCC) in 1999, acquiring the nickname 'JCB' from commentator Charlie Cox. In 2000 he turned to sports car racing with some success, and has raced several times in the 24 Hours of Le Mans. He earned a third place in the 2007 24 Hours of Le Mans, along with Emmanuel Collard and Romain Dumas a Pescarolo Sport entry.

After a stint with Rebellion Racing, he returned to Pescarolo Team for 2012, driving in the FIA World Endurance Championship.

Racing record

Complete International Formula 3000 results
(key) (Races in bold indicate pole position) (Races
in italics indicate fastest lap)

Complete Formula One results
(key)

† Driver did not finish the race, but was still classified as they completed 90% of the race distance.

Complete British Touring Car Championship results
(key) (Races in bold indicate pole position – 1 point awarded all races) (Races in italics indicate fastest lap) (* signifies that driver lead feature race for at least one lap – 1 point awarded)

24 Hours of Le Mans results

Complete European Le Mans Series results
(key) (Races in bold indicate pole position; races in italics indicate fastest lap)

Complete FIA World Endurance Championship results

External links

Motorsport interview
ESPN profile
Driver Database entry

1969 births
Living people
French racing drivers
French Formula One drivers
Sauber Formula One drivers
International Formula 3000 Champions
British Touring Car Championship drivers
French Formula Three Championship drivers
24 Hours of Le Mans drivers
International Formula 3000 drivers
European Le Mans Series drivers
FIA World Endurance Championship drivers
Pescarolo Sport drivers
Rebellion Racing drivers
DAMS drivers
Graff Racing drivers